Malmö FF were seriously involved in the 1997 chase for the Allsvenskan title, but fell short due to dropped points against bottom teams Degerfors and Öster in the 24th and 25th rounds out of 26. Having been unbeaten at home all season, playing decent possession football, the economic woes of the club forced them to sell Daniel Andersson and Yksel Osmanovski to Bari of Serie A the coming summer.

Squad (players used in Allsvenskan)

Goalkeepers
  Jonnie Fedel

Defenders
  Mattias Thylander
  Jörgen Ohlsson
  Christian Karlsson
  Tommy Jönsson
  Brune Tavell
  Olof Persson
  Mike Owusu
  Jonas Wirmola

Midfielders
  Hasse Mattisson
  Daniel Andersson
  Goran Trpevski
  Anders Andersson
  Björn Enqvist
  Niklas Gudmundsson

Attackers
  Yksel Osmanovski
  Patrik Olsson
  Dejan Pavlović
  Greger Andrijevski
  Niclas Kindvall

Allsvenskan

Matches

Top scorers
 Niclas Kindvall 12
 Yksel Osmanovski 10
 Hasse Mattisson 4
 Daniel Andersson 4

Sources
 Fotboll 1997 (Swedish football yearbook)

Malmö FF seasons
Malmo